Clavatula pseudomystica is a species of sea snail, a marine gastropod mollusk in the family Clavatulidae.

Description
The size of an adult shell varies between 17 mm and 28 mm.

Distribution
This species occurs in the Atlantic Ocean off Angola and Democratic Republic of Congo.

References

 Nolf, F. (2008). Two new turrid species from West Africa: Clavatula delphinae and Clavatula pseudomystica (Mollusca: Gastropoda: Clavatulidae). Neptunea 7(2): 6-13

External links
 

pseudomystica
Gastropods described in 2008